"Sometimes When I'm Dreaming" is a song written by Mike Batt, the writer of songs for The Wombles. It was originally recorded by Art Garfunkel for his album The Art Garfunkel Album.

The song was covered by Agnetha Fältskog for her 2004 album, My Colouring Book. The song was intended as the third single from the album, but because the LP had already disappeared from many album charts at the end of 2004, these plans were shelved. Another reason was Agnetha's reluctance of any promotion (other than music videos or telephone interviews), an example being her refusal to appear in the German TV series, Wetten dass..?.

However, several Swedish radio stations received a promo-CD-single that featured a remix of the song by Soundfactory. This time it was not a regular remix, but a slower, more pop oriented version with added instruments and backing vocals. The song leaked onto the internet and appeared on many bootlegs.

Other cover versions
Katie Melua also covered this song on the Piece By Piece (Special Bonus Edition) album.

Formats and track listings
The song was released as a promo only which was issued to some Swedish radio-stations:
CD-Promo-single
 "Sometimes When I'm Dreaming" [Soundfactory-Radio-Edit] 3:00

2004 singles
Songs about dreams
Agnetha Fältskog songs
Songs written by Mike Batt
Warner Music Group singles
1984 songs
Art Garfunkel songs